Nastoceras candidella is a moth in the family Autostichidae. It was described by Pierre Chrétien in 1922. It is found in Morocco.

References

Moths described in 1922
Symmocinae